Santi Protomartiri a Via Aurelia Antica is a 20th-century parochial church and titular church in western Rome, dedicated to the First Martyrs of the Church of Rome (died AD 64–67).

History 

Built in 1968, it was made a titular church to be held by a cardinal-priest on 30 April 1969. In 1985, Pope John Paul II visited this church.

Cardinal-protectors
Joseph Malula (1969–1989)
 Henri Schwery (1991–2021)
Anthony Poola (2022–present)

References

External link

Titular churches
San Protomartiri a Via Aurelia Antica
Roman Catholic churches completed in 1968
20th-century Roman Catholic church buildings in Italy
Romanesque Revival church buildings in Italy